Pasiasula is a genus of spiders in the family Thomisidae. It was first described in 1942 by Roewer. , it contains only one species, Pasiasula eidmanni, found on Bioko.

References

Thomisidae
Monotypic Araneomorphae genera
Spiders of Africa
Taxa named by Carl Friedrich Roewer